Racine is an 'L' station on the CTA's Blue Line. The station serves the Near West Side neighborhood and the western end of the UIC campus.

History 
The station opened on June 22, 1958, and is almost identical to every other station built in the median of the Eisenhower Expressway, including an island platform, a small station house on Racine's and Loomis's overpass containing only a ticket booth and turnstiles and a long passageway ramp connecting the two.

Service 
Racine sits at the base of the Loomis ramp, a double-tracked viaduct that rises from the expressway to join the Douglas Branch north of Polk station. Prior to April 28, 2008, the Blue Line split into two branches here. Trains to Forest Park continued west in the Congress Expressway, while the other trains took the Loomis Ramp to the Douglas branch to operate to 54th/Cermak. After April 28, 2008, the Douglas Branch service was discontinued and replaced by the Pink Line. Although the Loomis Ramp no longer is used for revenue service, it remains intact as the only track connection between the Blue Line and the rest of the system, allowing for non-revenue equipment moves. When construction or another means of traffic obstruction occurs on the Pink Line between Polk and Ashland, trains are routed via the Loomis Ramp to Racine, where they terminate.

Location 
The station is located at 430 South Racine Avenue and gives access to the University Village neighborhood and the western end of the UIC campus. It is in the Eisenhower Expressway median at surface level. The Loomis Street entrance to the Racine station is located near Whitney M. Young Magnet High School and Andrew Jackson Language Academy.

Bus connections 
CTA
  7 Harrison (Weekdays only)
  60 Blue Island/26th (Owl Service) 
  126 Jackson 

Pace
  755 Plainfield/IMD Express (Weekday Rush Hours only)

Notes and references

Notes

References

External links 
Racine (Congress Line) Station Page
Loomis Street entrance from Google Maps Street View
Racine Avenue entrance from Google Maps Street View

CTA Blue Line stations
Railway stations in the United States opened in 1958